Petrovice u Sušice is a municipality and village in Klatovy District in the Plzeň Region of the Czech Republic. It has about 600 inhabitants.

Administrative parts
Villages of Břetětice, Částkov, Chamutice, Dolní Kochánov, Františkova Ves, Jiřičná, Kojšice, Maršovice, Nová Víska, Pařezí, Posobice, Rovná, Strunkov, Svojšice, Trsice, Vojetice and Žikov are administrative parts of Petrovice u Sušice.

Gallery

References

Villages in Klatovy District
Bohemian Forest